Nam chim or nam jim is Thai for "dipping sauce". It can refer to a wide variety of dipping sauces in Lao cuisine and Thai cuisine, with many of them a combination of salty, sweet, spicy and sour.

Nam chim tend to be more watery in consistency than nam phrik (Thai chili pastes). Although Sriracha sauce is commonly known as sot Sriracha in Thailand (sot is the Thai pronunciation of the English word sauce), it is sometimes called nam chim Sriracha or nam phrik Sriracha.

A more-or-less generic and basic nam chim is used for grilled or steamed seafood. This sauce contains garlic, fish sauce, sugar, lime juice, and bird's eye chilies. Variations on this basic recipe find their use as a dipping sauce with and as an integral part of many dishes. Many of the ingredients in a nam chim are finely chopped or pounded in a mortar and pestle or, non-traditionally, ground in a blender.

Variants
Popular dipping sauces in Thailand are:
 Nam chim kai, sweet chili sauce is a very common all-round chili dipping sauce with the consistency of a thick syrup. It is medium spicy and very sweet, normally referred to as "sweet Thai chili sauce" in English. It is often used as a dipping sauce for grilled chicken (kai yang). It can be used as a generic chili sauce for other dishes. It forms the base of a few other types of nam chim, such as nam chim thot man pla ("dipping sauce for deep-fried fish cakes").
 Nam chim chaeo, using ground dry-roasted glutinous rice, this sauce is most often eaten with mu yang/mu ping (grilled pork) or kai yang (grilled chicken).
 Nam chim sate is the Thai version of peanut sauce; it is eaten with Thai satay.
 Achat is the Thai version of the Malay/Indonesian acar timun (cucumber pickles). The Thai variety consists of fresh chopped cucumber, spring onion and chili, mixed with vinegar. It is usually served with nam chim sate as a dip for satay.
 Nam chim suki  is eaten with Thai suki (the Thai version of the Chinese hot pot) and Mu kratha. The main ingredients are chili sauce, chili, garlic and sesame seeds.
 Nam chim taochiao, containing yellow soybean paste (taochiao), is eaten with khao man kai
 Nam chim thale — a basic dipping sauce made with garlic, fish sauce, lime juice, sugar and chilis — is usually eaten with grilled or steamed seafood.
 Nam chim thot man , served as a dip with thot man pla (fried fish cakes), is similar to nam chim kai but with chopped cucumber, crushed peanut and coriander (cilantro) leaves. For thot man kung or pu (fried prawn or crab cakes), however, a very sweet plum sauce is provided.
 Nam chim paesa is served as a sauce for steamed fish wrapped in steamed cabbage leaves.

See also
 Thai cuisine
 List of Thai ingredients
 List of Thai dishes
 List of condiments
 List of dips
 List of sauces

References

Thai cuisine
Sauces
Dips (food)